Elakatothrix is a genus of green algae, specifically of the Klebsormidiophyceae.

Etymology 
Genus name Elakatothrix is composed of elakato- prefix, "spindle", and –thrix suffix, "thread", literally "spindle thread", in reference to the tapered shape of individual cell of the colonial algae.

List of species
 E. auae Setchell 1924
 E. acuta Pascher 1915
 E. alpina Beck-Mannagetta 1926
 E. americana Wille 1899
 E. arvernensis Chodat & Chodat 1925
 E. bifurcata Kant & Gupta 1998
 E. biplex (Nygaard 1945) Hindák 1962
 E. gelatinosa Wille 1898
 E. gelifacta (Chodat 1902) Hindák 1987
 E. genevensis (Reverdin 1919) Hindák 1962
 E. gloeocystiformis Korshikov 1953
 E. gracilis Hortobagyi 1973
 E. inflexa Hindák 1966
 E. lacustris Korshikov 1953 non Beck-Mannagetta 1931
 E. linearis Pascher 1915
 E. minima Beck-Mannagetta 1929
 E. obtusata Flechtner, Johansen & Clark 1998
 E. ovalis (Ettl 1968) Hindák 1987
 E. parvula (Archer 1862) Hindák 1962
 E. pseudogelatinosa Korshikov 1953
 E. spirochroma (Reverdin 1917) Hindák 1962
 E. subacuta Korshikov 1939

References

External links

Scientific references

Scientific databases

 AlgaeBase
 AlgaTerra database
 Index Nominum Genericorum

Chlorophyceae genera